The Science Subcommittee on Space and Aeronautics is one of five subcommittees of the United States House Committee on Science and Technology.

Jurisdiction 

The subcommittee has legislative jurisdiction and general and special oversight and investigative authority on all matters relating to astronautical and aeronautical research and development including: 
 national space policy, including access to space;
 sub-orbital access and applications;
 National Aeronautics and Space Administration and its contractor and government-operated laboratories;
 space commercialization, including the commercial space activities relating to the Department of Transportation and the Department of Commerce;
 exploration and use of outer space;
 international space cooperation;
 National Space Council;
 space applications, space communications and related matters;
 Earth remote sensing policy;
 civil aviation research, development, and demonstration;
 research, development, and demonstration programs of the Federal Aviation Administration; and
 space law.

History 
Chairs of the subcommittee:
 Dana Rohrabacher (R), California, 1997-2005
 Ken Calvert (R), California, 2005-2007
 Mark Udall (D), Colorado, 2007-2009
 Gabby Giffords (D), Arizona, 2009-2011
 Steven Palazzo (R), Mississippi, 2011–2015
 Brian Babin (R), Texas 2015-2019
 Kendra Horn (D), Oklahoma, 2019-2021
 Don Beyer (D), Virginia, 2021-present

Members, 117th Congress

Historical membership rosters

115th Congress

116th Congress

See also 
United States Senate Commerce Subcommittee on Science and Space

References

External links 
 Subcommittee on Space and Aeronautics, official website
 Republican Subcommittee website

Science Space